Lieutenant Colonel Haroon Islam was a colonel in the Pakistan Army's Special Service Group (also known as Black Storks) who died during Operation Silence. He was a commanding officer of Operation Silence while commanding the Zarrar Anti Terrorist Unit. He was killed in fierce fighting which took place inside the Red Mosque Complex while leading a small force of 150 SSG members. The Special Service Group successfully took over the complex. On March 23, 2008, he was posthumously awarded the second highest civilian award, Hilal-e-Shujaat (Crescent of Bravery) by the President of Pakistan.

Biography
Haroon was born in a family of military background. His father himself was a deputy commissioner who had also participated in the Indo-Pakistani War of 1971. His elder brother is an Assistant Director in the FIA while another brother, Major Ehtisham-ul-Islam, is a retired Army Officer. He joined and gained commission in the 3rd Battalion of the Sindh Regiment of Pakistan Army in 1988. He was a graduate of Command and Staff College, Quetta in 1993 and joined Pakistan Army's elite special forces branch SSG (Special Service Group) in 1993. He had a successful military career. In 1998, his unit was deployed in Kargil, and had participated in Kargil War where he had led successful military operations.

In recognition of his services, he was awarded Chief of Army Staff Commendation Medal. During his career with the SSG, he commanded the elite Zarrar Company (The anti-terrorist unit of the SSG).

Operation Sunrise

In 2007, the conflict between Lal Masjid and the Government of Pakistan deepened, and the Government of Pakistan decided to launch a military operation against the Islamic extremists and Taliban terrorists. In July 2007, one of SSG battalion was assigned to a mission to capture and take absolute control of Red Mosque from Taliban militants. To achieve this task, the Pakistan Army assigned this task to 7th Commando Zarrar Battalion of SSG led by Lt. Col. Haroon Islam and the Army Rangers Anti-Terrorist Company (ATC) led by Major Tariq Anees. The operation, codenamed Operation Silence, was launched on July 3, 2007 and Islam was killed on the midnight of 8 July 2007, two days after having been hit by small arms fire while commanding the raid on Lal Masjid in Islamabad. The Second-in-Command Army Ranger's Major Tariq Anees was also seriously wounded. Reports indicate that he was hit while planting explosives on the outer perimeter wall of the complex. The shooter was Muhammad Maqsood, guard of Maulana Abdul Rashid Ghazi.  He was killed in the retaliatory fire by the security forces.

Free fall accident
Previously in his life, he survived a potentially fatal free fall accident when his parachute entangled with another. He not only survived the accident but became fit enough to rejoin the SSG. He was also a graduate of the prestigious Command and Staff College, Quetta. Because of his meritorious services, he had been awarded Chief of Army Staff Commendation Card.

In mourning
His death has left a deep legacy in Special Services Group. While he gained a respected place in SSG Division, on behalf of Prime Minister Shaukat Aziz and the federal cabinet, a two-member delegation consisting of Additional Secretary (Cabinet Division) Saeed Ahmad Khan and Joint Secretary (Cabinet Committee) Muhammad Zahid Khan visited the widow of Colonel Haroon Islam. On July 08, 2007, President and Chief of Army Staff General Pervez Musharraf, Vice Chief of Army Staff General Ahsan Saleem Hyat and a large number of other senior civil and military officers and relatives of the martyred officer had attended the Namaz-e-Janaza held at Chaklala, Pakistan. The Pakistan Army presented Guard of honour to Shaheed Lieutenant Colonel Haroon-ul-Islam. Later, his body was sent to Lahore for burial. He is buried in Military cemetery graveyard, Lahore.

References

External links
Lahore Metroblogs eulogy
Pakistan think tank eulogy

Year of birth missing
2007 deaths
Pakistani military personnel killed in action
Special Services Group officers
Punjabi people
Military personnel killed in the insurgency in Khyber Pakhtunkhwa
Military personnel from Lahore
People murdered in Islamabad